Blue Quill was a 19th-century First Nations chief of the Cree people in what is now Alberta.  Various locations, organizations and institutions are named for him:

Places
Blue Quill, Edmonton, a neighbourhood of that city
Blue Quill Estates, Edmonton, a neighbourhood of that city
Blue Quills First Nation Indian Reserve, a multi-band Indian Reserve in Alberta
Blue Quills National Wildlife Area

Organizations
Blue Quill's Band, a former band government in Alberta, now part of the Saddle Lake Cree Nation
Blue Quills First Nations College